Staryye Karamaly (İşke Qaramalı) is a rural locality (a village) in Chuvash-Karamalinsky Selsoviet, Aurgazinsky District, Bashkortostan, Russia. The population was 26 as of 2010. There are 2 streets.

Geography 
Staryye Karamaly is located 27 km southeast of Tolbazy (the district's administrative centre) by road. Chuvash-Karamaly is the nearest rural locality.

References 

Rural localities in Aurgazinsky District